Airlangga Hartarto (born 1 October 1962) is an Indonesian politician and businessman. He is the current Coordinating Minister for Economic Affairs in President Joko Widodo's Onward Indonesia Cabinet, appointed on 23 October 2019. He is also the chairman of Golkar Party.

Early life and education
Airlangga was born in the East Java capital of Surabaya on 1 October 1962. His father Hartarto Sastrosoenarto, an engineer and politician, served as a minister in various portfolios for former president Suharto for 15 years from 1983 to 1998.

Airlangga was active in the boy scouts, attending national and international jamborees. He completed high school at Kanisius College in Jakarta in 1981. He received a bachelor's degree in mechanical engineering from Gadjah Mada University in 1987. He  completed the AMP at  Wharton School of the University of Pennsylvania  and later received a master's degree in business administration from Monash University as well as a master's degree in management technology from the University of Melbourne. In 2019 he was awarded an honorary doctorate in Development Policy by The KDI School of Public Policy and Management.

Business career
Airlangga has been involved in numerous businesses, ranging from fertilizer distribution to paper packaging and construction machinery. Following are some of his corporate roles.
 Owner of fertilizer distributor PT Graha Curah Niaga.
 President Commissioner and Chairman of PT Fajar Surya Wisesa, a paper packaging manufacturer (1988–2016). The company was founded by Airlangga and Winarko Sulistyo in 1988. Airlangga's older brother Gunadharma in a 1998 email to  activist George Aditjondro described the publicly listed company as a "small competitor of Sinar Mas Group". 
 President Director of PT Jakarta Prima Cranes (1991). 
 Chairman of PT Ciptadana Sekuritas asset management firm (1994). The company was founded in 1990 and is now called PT Ciptadana Capital.
 In 2002, Airlangga resigned from the Board of Directors of Indonesian Investment Fund Limited, an open-ended equity mutual fund launched and run by PT Ciptadana Asset Management. Bermuda-registered Indonesian Investment Fund Limited was among companies listed in the Paradise Papers set of leaked documents related to offshore investments.  
 President Director of PT Bisma Narendra (1994). Founded in 1994, the company provides metal coating and allied services.
 Commissioner of PT Sorini Agro Asia Corporindo (2004). The company buys tapioca starch and sells its derivatives. 
 President Commissioner of PT Essar Dhananjaya, a manufacturer of steel coils and sheets.
 Commissioner of PT Hitachi Construction Machinery Indonesia.

Political career
Airlangga joined Golkar Party in 1998. In 2004, he became a member of the House of Representatives as a member of Golkar. He served as deputy treasurer of Golkar from 2004–2009. In his second term as a legislator in the 2009-2014 period, he chaired House Commission VI on industry, trade, investment and state-owned enterprises. During this time, he introduced the 2014 Industry Law. In his third term as a legislator, which commenced in 2014, he served in House Commission VII on mineral resources, environment, research and technology. In April 2015, he was transferred to Commission X on education, tourism, creative economy, culture, sports and youth. In January 2016, he became a member of Commission XI on financial affairs.

He was appointed to cabinet as industry minister on 27 July 2016 by President Joko Widodo. On 13 December 2017, he was selected to become Golkar chairman, replacing Setya Novanto, who had been arrested and put on trial for alleged corruption.

In 2019, Airlangga returned to Jokowi's Onward Indonesia Cabinet as Coordinating Minister of Economic Affairs.

Family
Airlangga is the younger brother of businessman Gunadharma Hartarto (1961-2004). His other siblings are Indira Asoka, Gautama and Maya Dewi. Airlangga is married to Yanti K. Isfandiary and they have eight children: Adanti, Ravindra, Audi, Dines, Bianda, Latascha, Maisara and Natalie. 3 out of the 8 children are now married.
Airlangga also has 2 grandchildren named Ophelia and Endaru.

References

1962 births
Living people
Gadjah Mada University alumni
People from Surabaya
Golkar politicians
Politicians from East Java
Monash University alumni
University of Melbourne alumni
Indonesian businesspeople
Government ministers of Indonesia
21st-century Indonesian politicians
Working Cabinet (Joko Widodo)
Members of the People's Representative Council, 2004
Members of the People's Representative Council, 2009
Members of the People's Representative Council, 2014
Onward Indonesia Cabinet
Industry ministers of Indonesia
People named in the Pandora Papers